The 1947 Auburn Tigers football team represented Auburn University in the 1947 college football season. It was the Tigers' 56th overall and 15th season as a member of the Southeastern Conference (SEC). The team was led by head coach Carl M. Voyles, in his fourth year, and played their home games at Cliff Hare Stadium in Auburn, the Cramton Bowl in Montgomery and Legion Field in Birmingham, Alabama. They finished the season with a record of two wins and seven losses (2–7 overall, 1–5 in the SEC).

Schedule

Source: 1947 Auburn football schedule

References

Auburn
Auburn Tigers football seasons
Auburn Tigers football